Elar or ELAR or Ellar may refer to:

Places
 Elar, now Abovyan, a town in Armenia
 Ellar, the former name of Lorasar, an abandoned village in Armenia

Other uses
 Endangered Languages Archive (ELAR)
 Ellar Coltrane (born 1994), an American actor

See also 
 Elar Char Adhyay, a 2012 Bengali film
 Ilar (disambiguation)
 Elah (disambiguation)